Alamgir Haq, usually referred to as just Alamgir (born 11 August 1955), is a Pakistani singer-songwriter, guitarist, and one of the pioneers of pop music in Pakistan. His style of singing is inspired by playback singer Ahmed Rushdi and Elvis Presley.

Early life
Alamgir was born on 11 August 1955 in East Pakistan (present-day Bangladesh). His father, Farmuzal Haq, was a politician and a member of the All India Muslim League as Secretary of Treasury and later a member of Pakistan's National Assembly during the presidency of Ayub Khan. He also studied in Mirzapur Cadet College, Tangail, in the province of East Bengal. He briefly studied at Shaheen School in Dhaka. In 1971 at the age of around 15, he moved to Karachi, West Pakistan to continue his studies at the University of Karachi before immigrating to the USA.

Career 
He settled in the PECHS area of Karachi and started singing in the evenings, around 1971, at a small café called 'Globe Hotel' on Tariq Road, Karachi. He was promised Rs. 350 per month plus free dinner. The café was famous for its intellectual gatherings and that is where his potential talent was spotted. Someone from the audience in the hotel liked his style of singing and playing the guitar. So that person told him about a programme on the Pakistan Television Corporation station called Ferozan where the program host Khushbakht Aliya was conducting a show for the youth. He gave his audition, Khushbakht liked his singing and the guitar playing but she had already selected someone else. It just so happened that renowned Pakistani music composer Sohail Rana was also sitting in the same room who later asked someone to call Alamgir to his car outside the TV station. Sohail Rana said, he liked his (Alamgir's) guitar playing and asked if he would like to perform as a guitarist for his children's programme Hum Hi Hum. This is how Alamgir entered in the formal world of music.

He started singing on the Pakistan Television Corporation TV channel at the beginning of the 1970s, when the people in Pakistan were not yet familiar with the modern Urdu pop music and when western music was generally considered as modern music in Pakistan. Shair Siddiqui hired him for the first pop musical program Sunday Ke Sunday, a TV series of Karachi Television in 1971, and introduced Alamgir with the song Albela Rahi. It proved to be a hit in 1972 among the youth of the 1970s. There was a time during the 1970s when the music loving boys and girls gathered regularly on the streets near the Karachi Jheel Park to get a glimpse of this new pop singer as he used to travel along in his red sports car in the evening.  Alamgir's second pop song, was also an Urdu translation of a foreign song. He soon became popular among the younger generation in the country. Alamgir is also known for his many renditions of Bengali music. The most notable Bengali song he is known to sing is Aamay Bhashaili Rey.

Alamgir quickly made his mark on the Pakistani music scene. He sang for the Pakistani television in the very beginning of his career, but later as the time passed, he started singing for the Pakistani music industry. He also performed abroad. Alamgir inherited polycystic kidney disease (PKD) from his mother, and underwent kidney dialysis three times per week and required a kidney transplant. He currently resides in Atlanta, Georgia, United States. He is respected by the music lovers everywhere and still performs in live concerts in America.

In 2012, Alamgir visited Pakistan and performed in various shows. He returned to Pakistan to make a comeback on the TV screen specially for his fans who grew up with him. In April 2013, Alamgir joined Meesha Shafi, Strings, Ali Azmat, and Shahzad Hasan as a judge on the singing talent show Music Icons which aired on ARY Digital TV channel. He gave a live interview at a morning show on PTV channel named Subh-e-Nau on 6 January 2014.

Awards and recognition

 Lifetime Achievement Award in 2012 by PTV

 Pride of Performance Award in 2013 by the President of Pakistan
 Special Nigar Award for Best Playback Singer for the film Aina

 Best Singer Award in 1986 by PTV

 Lifetime Achievement Award in 2019 by Pakistan Air Force
 Lifetime Achievement Award in 2019 by Hum TV

Film songs
Some playback songs of Alamgir are:
 Mujhay Dil Say Na Bhulana, Chahay Rokay Yeh Zamana ... (Duet with Mehnaz for Aina, Music: Robin Ghosh 
 Waada Karo Sajna, Chhu Keh Mujhay Tum Abhi, Bichhray Gay Na ... (Duet with Mehnaz for Aina, Music: Robin Ghosh) 
 Baharen, Teray Aanay Say.. (for movie Bobby And julie 1978), Music: Karim Shahabuddin 
 Dekha Na Tha Kabhi Hum Ne Yeh Samaan ... (Duet with Naheed Akhtar for movie Bobby And Julie 1978), Music: Karim Shahabuddin

Discography
The songs and albums of Alamgir which have been released are as follows:
 Mujahideen-e-Aflak: Tum Hi Say Aye Mujahido Jahan Ka Sabbat Hai (Produced by Pakistan Air Force)
 Aina
 Aamay Bhashaili Re
 Dekha Na Tha Kabhi Humne Ye Sama
 Dekh Tera Kia Rang Kar Dia Hai
 Gori Panghat Pe Tero
 Heart Beat (1992)
 Hum Sab Ka Pakistan
 Keh Dena
 Khayal Rakhna
 Maaon Ki Dua Puri Hui 
 Shaam Se Pehlay Aana 
 Cotton Fields

Upcoming biographical film
 Fawad Khan will play the role of Alamgir in the biographical film titled Albela Rahi. The film will be directed by Sultan Ghani and will be based on a script written by Ghani and Faisal Hashmi. Fog Catcher Films will produce the film, scheduled to begin production in May for 2017 release. Rana Kamran will be the director of the biopic.

See also
Pakistani pop music

References

1955 births
Living people
Bengali singers
Singers from Karachi
Mirzapur Cadet College alumni
Nigar Award winners
Recipients of the Pride of Performance
Pakistani emigrants to the United States
Pakistani playback singers
Pakistani musicians
Pakistani people of Bengali descent
Pakistani pop singers
Pakistani male singers
Pakistani rock guitarists
PTV Award winners
Pakistani guitarists